Former president Luiz Inácio Lula da Silva's presidential campaign was officially approved on 21 July 2022 in São Paulo. His running mate is former Governor of São Paulo Geraldo Alckmin. Lula was elected in 2002 for the first term and re-elected in 2006 for the second term and is a candidate for tri-election for the third term, after his successors, former president Dilma Rousseff, having been elected in 2010 for the first term and re-elected in 2014 for the second term and former mayor of São Paulo, Fernando Haddad, having been defeated in 2018.

Pre-candidacy
On 20 May 2021, in an interview to French magazine Paris Match, Lula confirmed that he was pre-candidate for the next year elections.

The Workers' Party national committee, on 13 April 2022, approved the nomination of former Governor of São Paulo Geraldo Alckmin (PSB) for Vice President. The ticket was officialized on 7 May, in a coalition formed by the Brazil of Hope Federation (formed by Workers' Party, Communist Party of Brazil and Green Party), Brazilian Socialist Party, Solidarity and PSOL REDE Federation. With the withdrawal of André Janones on 4 August, the ticket received official support of Avante and Agir.

Candidacy for President
The Workers' Party approved on 21 July 2022 the candidacy of former President Lula in the party's national convention. Lula will run for President for the sixth time, his third term and the first candidate for President member of a partisan federation. This modality of alliance was created in 2021.

Political positions

Abortion
On 4 April 2022, having said "madam can get an abortion in Paris, go to Berlin, look for a good clinic", and openly defended that "'it should be made a public health issue and everyone has the right". In a letter to Braziliian evangelicals, Lula stated that he is "personally against abortion," but that abortion policy "is not an issue to be decided by the President of the Republic, but by Congress".

Education
On 21 October 2022, Lula promised the return of the government funding for private university students.

Environment
In his first days of government, Lula will seek to convene an international climate conference in Brazil with other global leaders, to regain trust in the face of global public and political opinion, and to present his new plans for the protection of the Amazon rainforest, as the return of the Amazon Fund, of approximately $3 billion reais together with Germany and Norway.

Foreign policy
On 29 October 2022, in an article written for the French newspaper Le Monde, Lula said that Brazil will return to its leading role in the international stage, especially in the fields of the environment and renewable energies, Lula will also continue to claim a permanent seat for Brazil in the UN Security Council. In his government program, Lula reinforced the return of cooperation with the nations of Latin America, the Caribbean and Africa, in addition to strengthening the relationship with Mercosur, Unasur, Celac and the BRICS.

He will also seek to formalize a Brazil-European Union strategic partnership, to serve as a counterweight to a "possible new cold war" between the United States and China.

Health
On 17 October 2022, Lula promised to reinforce the budget of the Ministry of Health and the Brazilian Unified Health System, known as SUS, in addition to reduce to zero the queues for consultations and exams, affected by the pressure caused by the COVID-19 pandemic in Brazil.

Infrastructure
On 10 September 2022, Lula promised the return of the Growth Acceleration Program, better known as PAC, and the Minha Casa Minha Vida program, to accelerate economic growth and creation of jobs through public investment.

Endorsements

Brazilian Politicians 

Kátia Abreu, Senator for Tocantins and 2018 vice presidential candidate (second round)
Helder Barbalho, Governor of Pará (second round)
Joaquim Barbosa, former Justice of the Supreme Federal Court of Brazil
Fátima Bezerra, Governor of Rio Grande do Norte
Carlos Brandão, Governor of Maranhão
Fernando Henrique Cardoso, 34th President of Brazil (second round)
Roberto Freire, former Minister of Culture (second round)
Alexandre Frota, Federal Deputy from São Paulo (second round)
Ciro Gomes, former Governor of Ceará and 2022 Presidential Candidate (second round)
Tasso Jereissati, Senator for Ceará (second round)
César Maia, former Mayor of Rio de Janeiro
Eduardo Paes, Mayor of Rio de Janeiro (second round)
Leonardo Péricles, 2022 Presidential Candidate (second round)
Dilma Rousseff, 36th President of Brazil
José Sarney, 31st President of Brazil & 20th Vice President of Brazil (second round)
José Serra, Senator for São Paulo, former Governor of São Paulo, and former Mayor of São Paulo (second round)
Marina Silva, former Senator for Acre
Simone Tebet, Senator for Mato Grosso do Sul and 2022 presidential candidate (second round)
Sofia Manzano, President of Brazilian Communist Party and 2022 presidential candidate (second round)

International Politicians 

Amado Boudou, former Vice President of Argentina (2011–2015)
Jeremy Corbyn, Member of Parliament of the United Kingdom and former Leader of the Labour Party
Piedad Córdoba, former Senator of Colombia (1994–2010)
Rafael Correa, 45th President of Ecuador (2007–2017)
António Costa, Prime Minister of Portugal (second round)
Yolanda Díaz, Second Deputy Prime Minister of Spain (second round)
Roberto Gualtieri, Mayor of Rome (second round)
José Mujica, 40th President of Uruguay (second round)
Daniel Ortega, President of Nicaragua (second round)
Pedro Sánchez, Prime Minister of Spain (second round)

Music 
Fernanda Abreu, singer
Anavitória, musical duo
Anitta, singer
Arnaldo Antunes, singer
Duda Beat, singer
Inês Brasil, singer
Carlinhos Brown, singer
Gal Costa, singer
Teresa Cristina, singer
Djavan, singer
Zélia Duncan, singer
Emicida, rapper
Finneas, American singer-songwriter (second round)
Manu Gavassi, singer
Gilberto Gil, singer
Grag Queen, singer and drag queen
Gloria Groove, singer and drag queen
Olivia Hime, singer
Lenine, singer
Ludmilla, singer
Ben McKee, American bassist (Imagine Dragons)
Daniela Mercury, singer
Paulo Miklos, musician
Tom Morello, American guitarist (Rage Against the Machine & Audioslave)
Diogo Nogueira, singer
Zeca Pagodinho, singer
Valesca Popozuda, singer
Nando Reis, musician and producer
Maria Rita, singer
Racionais MC's, hip hop group
Marisa Monte, singer
Ivete Sangalo, singer (second round)
Iza, singer
Jão, singer
Juliette, singer, lawyer and makeup artist
Luísa Sonza, singer
Fernanda Takai, singer
Caetano Veloso, composer and singer
Martinho da Vila, singer
Pabllo Vittar, singer and drag queen
Paulinho da Viola, singer
Roger Waters, English singer (Pink Floyd)

Film and Television 
Cláudia Abreu, actress
José de Abreu, actor
Karim Aïnouz, film director
Juliana Alves, actress
Tata Amaral, film director
Jesuíta Barbosa, actor
Alice Braga, actress
Sonia Braga, actress
Humberto Carrão, actor
Deborah Evelyn, actress
Vera Fischer, actress
Bruno Gagliasso, actor
Bruno Garcia, actor
Danny Glover, American actor
Mark Hamill, American actor
Luciano Huck, television presenter (second round)
Natália Lage, actress & television presenter
Elisa Lucinda, actress
Bruna Marquezine, actress
Grazi Massafera, actress
Luísa Mell, actress
Kleber Mendonça, film director
Jason Momoa, American actor (second round)
Fernanda Montenegro, actress
Drica Moraes, actress
Camila Morgado, actress
Wagner Moura, actor
Felipe Neto, YouTuber
Marisa Orth, actress and singer
Silvero Pereira, actor
Chico Pinheiro, newscaster
Camila Pitanga, actress
Zezé Polessa, actress
Fabio Porchat, actor
Maitê Proença, actress
Mark Ruffalo, American actor
Letícia Sabatella, actress
Marcelo Serrado, actor
Marieta Severo, actress
Maisa Silva, television presenter and actress
Xuxa, television presenter, actress, and singer

Businesspeople 
João Amoêdo, banker and founder of New Party (second round)
Pérsio Arida, Former president of the Central Bank of Brazil (1995)
Edmar Bacha, economist
Otaviano Canuto, economist
Arminio Fraga, Former president of the Central Bank of Brazil (1999–2003)

Sports 
Antônio Arroyo, professional MMA fighter
Walter Casagrande, former professional footballer and pundit
Juninho Fonseca, professional footballer
Igor Julião, professional footballer
Vanderlei Luxemburgo, former professional footballer and coach
Joanna Maranhão, professional swimmer
Marta, professional footballer
Ana Moser, professional volleyballer
Neto, professional footballer
Paulinho, professional footballer
Juninho Pernambucano, professional footballer
Raí, professional footballer
Reinaldo, professional footballer
Diogo Silva, taekwondo athlete
Carol Solberg, professional volleyballer
Yuri, professional footballer

Philosophers 
Noam Chomsky, American linguist
Vijay Prashad, Indian-American Marxist historian

Other 
Paola Carosella, Argentine chef
Paulo Coelho, novelist
Neil Gaiman, English writer
Guilherme Leal, entrepreneur & majority shareholder of Natura (second round)
Alan Moore, English writer
Sebastião Salgado, photojournalist
Edward Snowden, former employee of the NSA and CIA

Publications 
Jacobin, American political magazine
Nature, British scientific journal
The New York Times, American newspaper
The Guardian, British newspaper

Candidates

The following politicians announced their candidacy. The political parties had up to 15 August 2022 to formally register their candidates.

Election result

See also
 Lulism
 2002 Brazilian general election
 2006 Brazilian general election
 Jair Bolsonaro 2022 presidential campaign
 Simone Tebet 2022 presidential campaign

References

External links
  
 
 
 
 

2022 in Brazilian politics
2022 Brazilian presidential campaigns
Workers' Party (Brazil)
Luiz Inácio Lula da Silva